The 33rd Bengal Native Infantry could refer to:

4th Prince Albert Victor's Rajputs in 1824
33rd Punjabis in 1861